The 2020–21 Maltese Premier League was the 106th season of the Maltese Premier League, the top-flight league football in Malta. Floriana were the defending champions, having won their 26th title the previous season.

On 10 March 2021, due to the outbreak of the COVID-19 pandemic in Malta, a decision was made by the Government of Malta to suspend all football activities in Malta for one month.

On 9 April, the season was abandoned due to the COVID-19 pandemic in Malta.

Teams 

Sixteen teams will compete in the league which will include the two teams promoted from the First Division. The promoted teams are Żejtun Corinthians, who will be playing their first season in the top division, and Lija Athetlic.

Venues

Personnel and kits 

 Additionally, referee kits are made by Macron, sponsored by TeamSports and FXDD.

Managerial changes

League table

Results

Season statistics

Top goalscorers

Red Cards

References

External links 
 Official website

Maltese Premier League seasons
Malta
1
Malta